Azad Marzabad (also Romanized as Āzād Marzābād) is a village in Mashhad-e Miqan Rural District, in the Central District of Arak County, Markazi Province, Iran. At the 2006 census, its population was 213, in 63 families.

References 

Populated places in Arak County